The Lady Decides is a fantasy novel by author David H. Keller, M.D. It was first published in 1950 by Prime Press in an edition of 400 copies, all of which were signed, numbered and slipcased.

Plot introduction
The novel concerns a man with a dream and an allegorical quest through Spain.

References

1950 American novels
American fantasy novels
Novels set in Spain